Alabonia staintoniella is a species of gelechioid moth. Here, it is placed within the subfamily Oecophorinae of the concealer moth family (Oecophoridae). Alternatively it has been placed in the Elachistidae or Depressariinae together with its presumed closest relatives.

Description
This little diurnal moth shows yellowish-brown hindwings, with silvery markings, two triangular white spots on the costal and on the inner edge and a blackish fringe. It presents very long labial palps

This species is very similar to Alabonia geoffrella, but it can be distinguished by the lack of dark lines in the terminal part of the wings.

The adults fly from July to August depending on the location.

Distribution and habitat
Alabonia staintoniella can be found in Europe and in the Near East. These moths live in shrubbery rich areas.

References

  (1942): Eigenartige Geschmacksrichtungen bei Kleinschmetterlingsraupen ["Strange tastes among micromoth caterpillars"]. Zeitschrift des Wiener Entomologen-Vereins 27: 105-109 [in German]. PDF fulltext

External links
 
 Lepiforum.de

Oecophorinae
Moths of Europe
Moths described in 1850